Gustav, also spelled Gustaf, is a male given name of likely Old Swedish origin, used mainly in Scandinavian countries, German-speaking countries, and the Low Countries, possibly meaning "staff of the Geats or Goths or gods", possibly derived from the Old Norse elements  ("Geats"), / ("Goths") or  ("gods"), and  ("staff"). This name has been borne by eight Kings of Sweden, including the 16th-century Gustav Vasa and the current king, Carl XVI Gustaf. It is a common name for Swedish monarchs since the reign of Gustav Vasa.
The name has entered other languages as well. The Latinised form is Gustavus. A side form of the name in Swedish is Gösta.

People

Royalty and nobility

Sweden
Gustav I (1496–1560), King of Sweden 1523–1560, whose reign marked the end of the Kalmar Union and the beginning of Swedish independence; founder of the Vasa dynasty
Gustav of Sweden (1568–1607), son of Eric XIV and Karin Månsdotter
Gustav II Adolf (1594–1632), or Gustavus Adolphus, King of Sweden 1611–1632, praised military leader during the Thirty Year War, sometimes referred to as the "Father of modern warfare" or "The Lion of the North"
Gustav of Vasaborg, (1616–1653), Swedish noble and military officer
Karl X Gustav (1622–1660), King of Sweden 1654–1660
Gustav III (1746–1792), King of Sweden 1771–1792, who highly influenced the arts of Sweden during the Neo-Classical era and who temporarily reinstated absolute monarchy
Gustav, Prince of Vasa (1799–1877), Crown Prince of Sweden
Gustav IV Adolf (1778–1837), King of Sweden 1792–1809
Prince Gustaf, Duke of Uppland (1827–1852), second son of Oscar I and Josephine of Leuchtenberg
Gustaf V (1858–1950), King of Sweden 1907–1950
Gustaf VI Adolf (1882–1973), King of Sweden 1950–1973
Prince Gustaf Adolf, Duke of Västerbotten (1906–1947)
Carl XVI Gustaf (born 1946), King of Sweden 1973–

Other places
Gustav of Saxe-Lauenburg (c. 1570–1597)
Gustav, Duke of Zweibrücken (1670–1731)
Gustav, Landgrave of Hesse-Homburg (1781–1848)
Count Gustav Kálnoky (1832–1898), Austro-Hungarian diplomat and statesman
Gustav, 7th Prince of Sayn-Wittgenstein-Berleburg (born 1969)

Others
Gustav Åbergsson (1775-1852), Swedish stage actor
Gustav Elijah Åhr (1996–2017), known as Lil Peep, American rapper and singer
Gustav von Alvensleben (1803–1881), Prussian General of the Infantry 
Gustav A. Anderson (1893-1983), American farmer and politician
Gustaf Andersson (1884–1961), Swedish politician
Gustavo Adolfo Bécquer (1836–1870), Spanish poet
Gustav Bauernfeind (1848–1904), German painter famous for his Orientalist paintings
Gustave Biéler (1904–1944), Swiss-born Canadian Special Operations Executive agent during World War II
Gustavo Charif (born 1966), writer, visual artist and film director
Gustave Colin (1814–1880), French politician
Gustave-Henri Colin (1828–1910), French painter
J. P. Gustav Lejeune Dirichlet (1805-1859), German mathematician
Gustav Hesselblad (1906–1989), Swedish military doctor
Gaspard-Gustave de Coriolis (1792–1843), scientist for whom the Coriolis effect is named
Gustaf Dalén (1869–1937), Swedish inventor and Nobel Prize laureate
Gustave Doré (1832–1883), French artist, engraver, and illustrator
Gustave Eiffel (1832–1923), French engineer, designer of the Eiffel Tower
Gustav Fechner (1801–1887), German philosopher, physicist, and scientist
Gustav Fehn (1892–1945), German general during World War II
Gustav A. Fischer (1848–1886), German explorer
Gustave Flaubert (1821–1880), French writer best known for Madame Bovary
Gustaf Fröding (1860–1911), Swedish author and poet
Gustav Fröhlich (1902–1987), German actor
Gustaf Gründgens (1899–1963), German actor 
Gustav Hamel (1889–1914), British aviation pioneer
Gustav A. Hedlund (1904–1993), American mathematician
Gustav Heinse (1896–1971) (real name Josef Klein), Bulgarian poet of Austrian origin
Gustav Anders Hemwall (1908–1998), American physician and pioneer in Prolotherapy
Gustav Henriksen (1872–1939), Norwegian businessman
Gustav Ludwig Hertz (1887–1975), German physicist and Nobel Prize laureate
Gustav Heynhold (1800–1860), German botanist
Gustav Holst (1874–1934), British composer
Gustáv Husák (1913–1991), President of Czechoslovakia
 (1842–1908), German painter 
C. Gustav J. Jacobi (1804-1851), German mathematician 
Gustav Jäger (naturalist) (1832–1917), German naturalist and doctor
Gustav Jäger (painter) (1808–1871), German painter
 (1865–1938), Austrian physicist and lecturer
Carl Gustav Jung (1875–1961), Swiss psychoanalyst and father of analytical psychology
Gustav Ritter von Kahr (1862–1934), German right-wing politician in Bavaria
Gustaf Kalliokangas (1873–1940), Finnish president
Gustav Kirchhoff (1824–1887), German physicist who contributed to the fundamental understanding of electrical circuits, spectroscopy, and black-body radiation
Gustav Klimt (1862–1918), Austrian symbolist painter of the Vienna Secession
Gustav Knittel (1914–1976), German Waffen-SS officer and convicted war criminal
Gustav Knuth (1901–1987), German actor 
Gustav Landauer (1870–1919), German anarchist philosopher
Gustaf Lantz (born 1981), Swedish politician
Gustaf de Laval (1845–1913), Swedish engineer, inventor and entrepreneur
Gustave Le Bon (1841–1931), French psychologist, sociologist, and physicist
Gustav Leonhardt (1928–2012), Dutch keyboard player, conductor, musicologist, teacher, and editor
Heinrich Gustav Magnus (1802–1870), German chemist and physicist
Gustav Mahler (1860–1911), Austrian composer and conductor
Gustav Meyrink (1868–1932), Austrian author, novelist, dramatist, translator, and banker
Gustave Moreau (1826–1898), French painter
Gustaf Munthe (1896–1962), Swedish writer, art historian, and art teacher
Gustav Nezval (1907–1998), Czech actor
Gustav Nyquist (born 1989), Swedish professional hockey player
Gustav Otto (1883–1926), German aircraft and aircraft-engine designer and manufacturer
Oscar Gustave Rejlander, pioneering Victorian art photographer and an expert in photomontage
Gustav Rochlitz (1889–1972), German art dealer
Gustav Scanzoni von Lichtenfels (1855–1924), German general
Gustav Schäfer (rower) (1906–1991), German Olympic rower
Gustav Schäfer, drummer for the German rock band Tokio Hotel
Gustav Schickedanz (1895–1977), German entrepreneur
Gustav A. Schneebeli (1853–1923), U.S. Representative from Pennsylvania
Gustav Schröder (1885–1959), German sea captain 
Gustav Schwarzenegger (1907–1972), Austrian police chief and Nazi German military officer
Gustaf Skarsgård (born 1980), Swedish actor
Gustav Spörer (1822–1895), German astronomer
Gustav Stickley (1858–1942), American furniture maker, invented the Mission style of Craftsman furniture
Gustav Sule (1910–1942), Estonian javelin thrower
Gustavus von Tempsky (1828–1868), Anglo-Prussian explorer and adventurer in New Zealand Wars
Gustav Vigeland (1869–1943), Norwegian sculptor
Gustaf Welin (1930–2008), Swedish Army lieutenant general 
Gustave Whitehead (1874–1927), German-American aviator
Gustav Wood, vocalist in British rock band Young Guns
Gustavs Zemgals (1871–1939), Latvian president 1927–1930
Gustav Zeuner (1828–1907), German physicist and engineer

In fiction
Gustav (Zoids), transportation mecha from the Zoids fictional universe
Gustav Graves, villain in the James Bond series
Gustavo Fring, businessman and major narcotics distributor in the Breaking Bad franchise

Other uses
 Gustave (crocodile), a large Nile crocodile in Burundi

See also
Carl Gustav (disambiguation)
Gustafson
Gösta

Norwegian masculine given names
Swedish masculine given names
Danish masculine given names
Finnish masculine given names
Estonian masculine given names
Icelandic masculine given names
German masculine given names
Dutch masculine given names
Czech masculine given names
Slovak masculine given names
Slovene masculine given names
Croatian masculine given names
Masculine given names